Nikolay Zakharovich Karakulov (10 August 1918 – 10 March 1988) was a Soviet sprinter who won gold medals at the 1946 and 1950 European championships. Domestically he won 17 Soviet titles, including seven consecutive titles over 100 m from 1943 to 1949.

In 1957 he was awarded the Order of the Red Banner of Labour.

References

1918 births
1988 deaths
People from Perm Krai
European Athletics Championships medalists
Honoured Masters of Sport of the USSR
Recipients of the Order of the Red Banner of Labour
Soviet Athletics Championships winners
Russian male sprinters
Soviet male sprinters